Francisco Pol Hurtado (born September 17, 1987, in Caracas) is a Venezuelan professional footballer who currently plays as a midfielder for Venezuelan club Mineros de Guayana.

References

External links
 Onsports.gr Profile
 Onsports Profile
 
 epae.org Profile
 

1987 births
Living people
Venezuelan footballers
Super League Greece players
Paniliakos F.C. players
Aias Salamina F.C. players
Deportivo Miranda F.C. players
Panachaiki F.C. players
Asteras Tripolis F.C. players
Athlitiki Enosi Larissa F.C. players
Venezuelan expatriate footballers
Expatriate footballers in Greece
Panegialios F.C. players
Association football midfielders
Venezuelan expatriate sportspeople in Greece
Asteras Vlachioti F.C. players